Allied Bank may refer to:

 Allied Banking Corporation, a commercial bank in the Philippines
 Allied Bank Limited, a commercial bank in Pakistan
 Allied Bank Zimbabwe Limited, a commercial bank in Zimbabwe
 Allied Bank Uganda Limited, the name of Bank of Africa (Uganda) from 1996 until 2006